Andreas Christian Spång (born November 7, 1978) is a Swedish professional mixed martial arts (MMA) fighter who last competed in 2014. A professional competitor since 2008, he has competed for Bellator, the MFC, and Strikeforce.

Personal life
Andreas Spang first learned boxing at the age of three from his father who had been an amateur boxer in Sweden. As he stated in a Bellator interview, Spang says, "It is important to be a role model for my family." He lives with his wife and young son in Las Vegas, Nevada.

Spang defines himself as a "striker by nature." As an amateur boxer, Spang has a record of 15-5 and went 1-0 as a professional K-1 fighter.

Mixed martial arts career

Early career
Spang made his professional MMA debut on April 5, 2008 when he fought at the Fight Fiesta de Luxe: Unstoppable event in Luxembourg and won his first match via unanimous decision. Sprang quickly rose up the middleweight ranks, compiling a 5-0 record. 6 of his 8 victories have been by knockout or submission win, all in the first round.

Bellator Fighting Championships
Andreas Spang is currently signed to Bellator Fighting Championships and competed in their season six middleweight tournament. Spang welcomed the opportunity to fight in the Bellator middleweight tournament when he replaced Bruno Santos, who was originally scheduled to face Rogers.

Spang made his Bellator debut at Bellator 66 on April 21, 2012 in a middleweight tournament semifinal match, where he defeated the highly aggressive Brian "The Predator" Rogers with an impressive come-from-behind KO victory.

He faced Maiquel Falcão in the finals at Bellator 69.  After rocking Maiquel Falcão in the first round, Spang was controlled by Falcão's wrestling for the remainder of the fight and lost via unanimous decision.

In January 2013, Bellator announced Spang as a competitor in the Season Eight Middleweight tournament. His Quarterfinal fight took place at Bellator 89 against Doug Marshall. He lost via knock out in the first round.

World Series of Fighting
On July 15, 2015, it was announced that Spång signed with the World Series of Fighting to compete in the Light Heavyweight division.

Controversy
Spang was involved in a post-fight scuffle which marred his comeback at Bellator 66. Maiquel Falcão who had fought earlier that night defeating Vyacheslav Vasilevsky to secure his own spot in the middleweight finals, was brought into the cage to do a face-off with Spang for the first time after Spang's fight. When they moved in close to each other, Spang immediately shoved Falcão. Startled by this, the much publicized temperament of Falcão rushed back at him with a knee to the ribcage and then lifted up his hand as if looking to throw a punch. Officials, Bellator commentator/former fighter Jimmy Smith and fight matchmaker Sam Caplan separated the two from one another.

Spang, who also shoved Brian Rogers at Thursday's event during the fight's weigh-ins to get inside his opponent's head and not out of hatred, was apologetic to the crowd after the melee incident. He even apologized again at the post-fight press conference with Bellator CEO Bjorn Rebney in attendance, stating he just doesn't like people getting up in his face.

Disciplinary action from the Ohio Athletic Commission, which oversaw the event, will determine if any fines and/or suspensions should be lifted against both fighters.

Kickboxing record

|-
|-  bgcolor="#CCFFCC"
| 2006-08-12 || Win ||align=left| Jaime Fletcher || K-1 World Grand Prix 2006 in Las Vegas II, Reserve Match || Las Vegas, Nevada, USA || Decision (majority) || 3 || 3:00
|-
|-  bgcolor="#FFBBBB"
| 2006-03-03 || Loss ||align=left| Raymond Daniels || World Combat League || United States || Decision (15-7) || 1 || 3:00
|-
|-
| colspan=9 | Legend:

Mixed martial arts record

|-
| Win
| align=center| 9–3
| J.A. Dudley
| Decision (unanimous)
| Matrix Fights 9
| 
| align=center| 3
| align=center| 5:00
| Philadelphia, Pennsylvania, United States
|Heavyweight debut.
|-
| Loss
| align=center| 8–3
| Doug Marshall
| KO (punch)
| Bellator 89
| 
| align=center| 1
| align=center| 3:03
| Charlotte, North Carolina, United States
| 
|-
| Loss
| align=center| 8–2
| Maiquel Falcão
| Decision (unanimous)
| Bellator 69
| 
| align=center| 3
| align=center| 5:00
| Lake Charles, Louisiana, United States
| Bellator Season Six Middleweight Tournament Final.
|-
| Win
| align=center| 8–1
| Brian Rogers
| KO (punch)
| Bellator 66
| 
| align=center| 2
| align=center| 3:34
| Cleveland, Ohio, United States
| Bellator Season Six Middleweight Tournament Semifinal.
|-
| Win
| align=center| 7–1
| Willie Parks
| TKO (punches)
| Strikeforce Challengers 20
| 
| align=center| 1
| align=center| 3:10
| Las Vegas, Nevada, United States
| 
|-
| Win
| align=center| 6–1
| Cody Krahn
| Submission (guillotine choke)
| MFC 30
| 
| align=center| 1
| align=center| 1:18
| Edmonton, Alberta, Canada
| 
|-
| Loss
| align=center| 5–1
| Ali Mokdad
| Submission (rear-naked choke)
| MFC 29
| 
| align=center| 1
| align=center| 1:35
| Windsor, Ontario, Canada
| 
|-
| Win
| align=center| 5–0
| Chaun Sims
| TKO (punches)
| Ring of Fire 38 - Ascension
| 
| align=center| 1
| align=center| 3:38
| Broomfield, Colorado, United States
| 
|-
| Win
| align=center| 4–0
| B.J. Lacy
| Decision (unanimous)
| MMA Xplosion: Super Fight Night
| 
| align=center| 3
| align=center| 5:00
| Las Vegas, Nevada, United States
| 
|-
| Win
| align=center| 3–0
| Andre Walker
| Submission (guillotine choke)
| Ring of Fire 36: Demolition
| 
| align=center| 1
| align=center| 2:20
| Denver, Colorado, United States
| 
|-
| Win
| align=center| 2–0
| Ryan Ballingall
| Submission (guillotine choke)
| North American Challenge 25
| 
| align=center| 1
| align=center| 0:54
| North Vancouver, British Columbia, Canada
| 
|-
| Win
| align=center| 1–0
| Karim Khalifa
| Decision (unanimous)
| Fight Fiesta de Luxe: Unstoppable
| 
| align=center| 3
| align=center| 5:00
| Hollerich, Luxembourg
|

Professional boxing record

| style="text-align:center;" colspan="8"|0 Wins (0 knockouts, 0 decision),  0 Losses, 1 Draw
|-
|align=center style="border-style: none none solid solid; background: #e3e3e3"|Res.
|align=center style="border-style: none none solid solid; background: #e3e3e3"|Record
|align=center style="border-style: none none solid solid; background: #e3e3e3"|Opponent
|align=center style="border-style: none none solid solid; background: #e3e3e3"|Type
|align=center style="border-style: none none solid solid; background: #e3e3e3"|Rd., Time
|align=center style="border-style: none none solid solid; background: #e3e3e3"|Date
|align=center style="border-style: none none solid solid; background: #e3e3e3"|Location
|align=center style="border-style: none none solid solid; background: #e3e3e3"|Notes
|-align=center
|Draw
|align=center|0-0-1||align=left| Alvaro Morales
|MD
|4 (4)
|2007-05-12
|align=left| Reno Events Center, Reno, Nevada, United States
|align=left|
|-align=center

External links

References

1978 births
Living people
Swedish male boxers
Swedish male mixed martial artists
Middleweight mixed martial artists
Mixed martial artists utilizing boxing
Mixed martial artists utilizing kickboxing
Swedish male kickboxers